The Ayan-Yuryakh is a river in the Magadan Oblast of Russia. It is a left tributary of the Kolyma river, which forms at the confluence of the Ayan-Yuryakh and the Kulu.

Course
The source of the river is in the Khalkan Range.
The river flows across the Upper Kolyma Highlands and is fed primarily by rain and snow.

See also
 Belichan
 List of rivers of Russia
 Nera Plateau

References 

Rivers of the Sakha Republic
Rivers of Magadan Oblast
Tributaries of the Kolyma